Travis Lutter (born May 12, 1973) is a retired American mixed martial artist who won The Ultimate Fighter 4 reality show. He is a black belt in Brazilian Jiu-Jitsu under Carlos Machado.

Background
Lutter was born and raised in Gann Valley, South Dakota in a farmer family of seven. He began wrestling when he was 12 years old, continuing through high school where he earned All-State honors and then also competed during his first two years attending Northern State University, where he majored in criminal justice. Lutter had originally begun training in Muay Thai, before viewing an early UFC event dominated by Brazilian Jiu-Jitsu specialist, Royce Gracie. Lutter then moved to Dallas, Texas and began training in Brazilian Jiu-Jitsu.

Mixed martial arts career

The Ultimate Fighter

With this victory, Lutter became the challenger for Anderson Silva's Middleweight title.  Lutter dedicated his victory on November 11 to the Wounded Warrior Project, an organization dedicated to support wounded U.S. servicemen.

Title shot
On the day of the weigh-in, one day before the February 3, 2007 bout at UFC 67, Lutter failed to make weight.  He weighed-in at 187 pounds on the first attempt, and 186.5 two hours later on his second attempt.  Because of his failure to meet the required 185 pounds, his match with Silva was changed to a three-round, non-title bout. This upset many fans, and he was booed upon his entrance into the octagon. Lutter would go on to lose in the second round via submission due to a triangle choke.

After TUF
Lutter was scheduled to return to the UFC at UFC 74 on August 25, 2007 against UFC newcomer Ryan Jensen; however he was forced to withdraw from the event due to a neck injury. After over a year's absence from the UFC, Lutter was next matched against former UFC Middleweight Champion Rich Franklin at UFC 83. After nearly catching Franklin with an armbar in the first round, Lutter was defeated by Franklin in the second round by TKO.

After losing two consecutive bouts, Lutter was released from his UFC contract. This makes him the first Ultimate Fighter winner to be released from UFC contract. He defeated Jason "The Athlete" MacDonald in the main event of Maximum Fighting Championship 22 on October 2, 2009.

Lutter's next bout occurred on May 21, 2010, against Rafael Natal. This bout was part of the Moosin: God of Martial Arts show in Worcester, Massachusetts. After 2 take down attempts Lutter was noticeably tired, he lost by knockout in the first round.

Retirement
Due to the extensive neck injury sustained in the Natal fight and the subsequent long layoff from fighting resulted in Lutter's retirement from professional mixed martial arts competition. Secretly hoping to make it back to the UFC, Lutter did not publicly announce his retirement until a 2019 blog post.

Personal life
Lutter is married and has four children. Lutter owns and operates a martial arts training center in Fort Worth, TX, offering Brazilian Jiu-Jitsu, boxing and mixed martial arts.

Championships and accomplishments
Ultimate Fighting Championship
The Ultimate Fighter 4 Middleweight winner
HOOKnSHOOT
HnS Light Heavyweight Championship (One time)

Grappling credentials
Winner Ultimate Submission Challenge 2003
Competitor 2001 ADCC World Championships
Competitor 2000 ADCC World Championships
Winner 2001 National USA ADCC Qualifier
Winner 2000 National USA ADCC Qualifier
Brazilian Jiu-Jitsu Black Belt under Carlos Machado
1st place 2001 Texas State BJJ Champion
3rd place Heavyweight Purple Belt, 2000 Brazilian Jiu-Jitsu World Championships; Rio de Janeiro, Brazil
3rd place Purple Belt Heavyweight, 2000 Pan-American Games
1st place Heavyweight Champion 1999 Texas Brazilian Jiu-Jitsu Open
1st place Heavyweight and Overall Champion 1998 Texas Brazilian Jiu-Jitsu Championships
2nd place 1998 Brazilian Jiu-Jitsu World Championships; Rio de Janeiro, Brazil
1st place Heavyweight Champion 1998 USA Brazilian Jiu-Jitsu Championships
1st place Heavyweight Champion 1997 San Antonio Brazilian Jiu-Jitsu Open

Mixed martial arts record

|-
| Loss
| align=center| 10–6
| Rafael Natal
| KO (punches)
| Moosin: God of Martial Arts
| 
| align=center| 1
| align=center| 4:12
| Worcester, Massachusetts, United States
| 
|-
| Win
| align=center| 10–5
| Jason MacDonald
| Decision (unanimous)
| MFC 22
| 
| align=center| 3
| align=center| 5:00
| Enoch, Alberta, Canada
| 
|-
| Loss
| align=center| 9–5
| Rich Franklin
| TKO (punches)
| UFC 83
| 
| align=center| 2
| align=center| 3:01
| Montreal, Quebec, Canada
| 
|-
| Loss
| align=center| 9–4
| Anderson Silva
| Submission (triangle choke)
| UFC 67
| 
| align=center| 2
| align=center| 2:11
| Las Vegas, Nevada, United States
| 
|-
| Win
| align=center| 9–3
| Patrick Côté
| Submission (armbar)
| The Ultimate Fighter: The Comeback Finale
| 
| align=center| 1
| align=center| 2:18
| Las Vegas, Nevada, United States
| 
|-
| Win
| align=center| 8–3
| Cedric Marks
| Submission (armbar)
| IFF 1: International Freestyle Fighting 1
| 
| align=center| 1
| align=center| 1:15
| Ft. Worth, Texas, United States
| 
|-
| Win
| align=center| 7–3
| Jose Landi-Jons
| Submission (armbar)
| Cage Rage 15
| 
| align=center| 1
| align=center| 4:00
| London, England
| 
|-
| Loss
| align=center| 6–3
| Trevor Prangley
| Decision (unanimous)
| UFC 54: Boiling Point
| 
| align=center| 3
| align=center| 5:00
| Las Vegas, Nevada, United States
| 
|-
| Win
| align=center| 6–2
| Matt Ewin
| Submission (keylock)
| Cage Rage 12
| 
| align=center| 1
| align=center| 1:40
| London, England
| 
|-
| Loss
| align=center| 5–2
| Matt Lindland
| Submission (guillotine choke)
| UFC 52: Couture vs Liddell
| 
| align=center| 2
| align=center| 3:32
| Las Vegas, Nevada, United States
| 
|-
| Win
| align=center| 5–1
| Marvin Eastman
| KO (punch)
| UFC 50
| 
| align=center| 2
| align=center| 0:33
| Atlantic City, New Jersey, United States
| 
|-
| Win
| align=center| 4–1
| Grzegorz Jakubowski
| Submission (kimura)
| EVT 2: Hazard
| 
| align=center| 2
| align=center| 2:45
| Stockholm, Sweden
| 
|-
| Win
| align=center| 3–1
| Mark Epstein
| Submission (rear-naked choke)
| EVT 1: Genesis
| 
| align=center| 2
| align=center| 2:45
| Copenhagen, Denmark
| 
|-
| Loss
| align=center| 2–1
| Jorge Rivera
| TKO (punches)
| USMMA 2: Ring of Fury
| 
| align=center| 3
| align=center| 3:46
| Lowell, Massachusetts, United States
| 
|-
| Win
| align=center| 2–0
| Chris Munsen
| Submission (rear-naked choke)
| HOOKnSHOOT: Relentless
| 
| align=center| 1
| align=center| 0:45
| Evansville, Indiana, United States
| 
|-
| Win
| align=center| 1–0
| James Cooper
| Decision
| PRW: Power Ring Warriors
| 
| align=center| 3
| align=center| 5:00
| Humble, Texas, United States
|

References

External links
Official site

1973 births
Living people
The Ultimate Fighter winners
American male mixed martial artists
Middleweight mixed martial artists
Mixed martial artists utilizing Brazilian jiu-jitsu
American practitioners of Brazilian jiu-jitsu
People awarded a black belt in Brazilian jiu-jitsu
Mixed martial artists from South Dakota
People from Chamberlain, South Dakota
Ultimate Fighting Championship male fighters